Lhote is a French surname that may refer to the following notable people:
Amandine Lhote (born 1986), French canoeist
André Lhote (1885–1962), French painter
Henri Lhote (1903–1991), French explorer, ethnographer, and discoverer of prehistoric cave art
Pauline Lhote, French winemaker 

French-language surnames